"800-pound gorilla" is an American English expression for a person or organization so powerful that it can act without regard to the rights of others or the law. 

The phrase is rooted in a riddle joke:

This highlights the disparity of power between the 800-pound gorilla and ordinary humans.

The term can describe a powerful geopolitical and military force, or, in business, a powerful corporate entity that has such a large majority percentage of whatever market they compete within that they can use that strength to crush would-be competitors.

In law, the phrase occurs semi-(in)formally as a characterization of judges vs. courts; as in: "Standard/Court Rule" vs "Gorilla/Judge Rule".

The metaphor has been mixed, on occasion, with the metaphor of the elephant in the room.

See also
King Kong
Elephant joke

The Emperor's New Clothes
Might makes right

References

American English idioms
Metaphors referring to animals